Cervià de les Garrigues is a village in the province of Lleida and autonomous community of Catalonia, Spain.

References

External links
 Government data pages 

Municipalities in Garrigues (comarca)
Populated places in Garrigues (comarca)